Penicillium copticola is a species of the genus of Penicillium which was isolated from the twigs, leaves, and apical and lateral buds of the plant Cannabis sativa L.

See also
List of Penicillium species

References 

copticola
Fungi described in 2011